The DR Congo A' national team is the local national football team of the DR Congo (formerly Zaire, alternatively known as Congo-Kinshasa) and is open only to domestic league players. The team represents DR Congo at the African Nations Championship and is governed by the Congolese Association Football Federation. They are nicknamed The Leopards.

DR Congo won the maiden African Nations Championship hosted by Ivory Coast in 2009 and repeated the feat at the 2016 tournament. Since 2014, all DR Congo A' team matches have been recognized by FIFA as first team matches.

African Nations Championship record

Results and Fixtures

Results

Fixtures

Squad
The following players were called up for the 2020 African Nations Championship matches against Central African Republic.
Caps and goals as of 20 October 2019 after the match against Central African Republic.

Previous squads

African Nations Championship squads
 CHAN 2011 squad
 CHAN 2016 squad

Honours

African Nations Championship:
  Champions: 2009, 2016

References

External links
 Congolese Association Football Federation

A
DR Congo